Tetraopes submersus is an extinct species of beetle in the family Cerambycidae. It was described by Theodore Dru Alison Cockerell in 1908. It existed in what is now the United States.

References

†
Fossil taxa described in 1908
Extinct beetles